Suitland High School is a public magnet high school located in the Suitland census-designated place in unincorporated Prince George's County, Maryland, United States, near Forestville. It is a part of Prince George's County Public Schools.

The school serves: all of Suitland CDP, a section of the City of District Heights, a section of the town of Capitol Heights, all of Coral Hills CDP, portions of Forestville CDP, and a portion of Silver Hill CDP.

History
Mr. Walter R. Battle, former principal of (then) Francis Scott Key Junior High School (7th, 8th and 9th grades), became the principal of (then) Suitland Senior High School (only 10th, 11th and 12th grades) in the fall of 1978. In the fall of 1981, the junior high schools became middle schools and the senior high schools dropped the "senior" nomenclature adding 9th grade to their enrollment.

Dr. Joe Hairston was principal from the school's inception as a magnet school in 1987 until the mid-1990s, when he left to be Superintendent of the Clayton County Board of Education in Jonesboro, Georgia, and later, Superintendent of Baltimore County Public Schools for 12 years.

Mark Fossett was principal for more than a decade. Nate Newman was principal from 2012–2017. Dr. Angelique Acevedo-Barron has been co-principal since 2016. During the school year (SY) of 2017–2018, Assistant Principal Danny Miller will become co-principal due to Nate Newman becoming principal of Green Valley Academy.

In 2009 Sheryll Cashin said in The Failures of Integration: How Race and Class are Undermining the American Dream that Suitland High was one of several mostly black, mostly middle class PG County public high schools that were "decidedly underachieving: fewer than half of the seniors at these schools went on to attend four-year colleges in recent years."

Beginning with the 2016–2017 school year, students previously attending the closed Forestville High School (a.k.a. Forestville Military Academy) began attending Suitland High. This was done so Suitland High School could get more funding from Maryland state agencies.

The approximate student enrollment as of March 2017 stands at about 2,157 students in grades nine through twelve.

Suitland High has a mandatory uniform policy.

Academics

Center for the Visual and Performing Arts magnet program
The Center for the Visual and Performing Arts is a rigorous four-year arts program that offers artistically talented high school students from all over Prince George's County educational opportunities designed to prepare them artistically for college, professional study, or career options in the arts. Strong association with the arts in the Washington, DC area offers distinct advantages. Students study with professional artists, dancers, actors, musicians, singers, directors, and producers. Students explore and eventually major in music, dance, theater, and visual arts.

The Center has been in existence at Suitland High School since 1986 and functions as a school-within-a-school. Each year, graduating students earn millions in scholarship awards and attend some of the most prestigious conservatories, colleges, and universities in the country.

Frequent collaborations with local arts institutions such as the John F. Kennedy Center for the Performing Arts, the University of Maryland Clarice Smith Performing Arts Center, and the Washington Performing Arts Society provide students with opportunities to meet and learn from many of today's successful artists.

Admission into the VPA magnet program is through audition only.

Suitland High School offers the 950-seat Annabelle E. Ferguson Auditorium, an experimental theater, and a fully equipped dance studio.

International Baccalaureate magnet program
The International Baccalaureate (IB) Diploma Program is an academically challenging and balanced course of study that prepares students for success in college and life beyond. Its mission is to develop inquiring, knowledgeable, and caring young people who help to create a better, more peaceful world through intercultural understanding and respect.

Benefits of the IB Diploma Program include:

 Higher university and college acceptance rates for IB graduates than for total population applicants
 Increased scholarship and grant opportunities
 A college-level academic program that transitions students to university and college standards
 Interdisciplinary instruction to encourage international-mindedness
 Fostering of lifelong learning
 Teacher development using IB strategies

Technical Academy
The Technical Academy Programs provide students with technical skills and knowledge that add value to their academic education. The programs are designed to prepare students with post-secondary options (college, workforce, and/or military) in their chosen career fields. The programs are organized into Maryland Career Clusters. These clusters are driven by what students need to know in order to graduate fully prepared for post-secondary education and a career. Students will be prepared for a high-skill, high-wage, high-demand career in this 21st-century global economy.

The academy currently offers seventeen programs, many of which lead to professional certifications and/or licensures. The programs are offered in nine high schools (Bladensburg, Croom Vocational, Crossland, Forestville, Gwynn Park, Laurel, Suitland, Tall Oaks Vocational, and Henry A. Wise) and serves the entire county. All of the schools serve students in grades 11 and 12.

The Technical Academy teaching pedagogy utilizes both theory and practical experiences. The Foundation of Automotive and Construction Technology for Students (FACTS) is one of the Academy partners responsible for the student-built house projects and the Student Auto Group Enterprise. This project provides practical hands-on experience which enables students to build a house from start to finish, and provides the auto students the opportunity to learn the operations of the auto repair and sales industries. Students wishing to participate in the Technical Academy Program must go through the application process. Students are selected based on their career interest, academic achievement and attendance.

Notable alumni
 Andrew Bayes - American football player
 NaVorro Bowman - Penn State and NFL football player
 John E. Courtney, PhD - Chief Executive Officer of American Society for Nutrition
 George O. Gore II - actor, New York Undercover, My Wife and Kids
 Peter Greenberg - Stanford University School of Medicine Professor and cancer researcher
 Steny Hoyer - Majority Leader, U.S. House of Representatives
 Lamont Jordan - University of Maryland and NFL football player
 Andrew Maynard - American Boxer - Olympics
 Nick Nelson - University of Wisconsin and NFL football player
 Chad Scott - NFL football player
 Devin Tyler - Temple University and NFL Football player
 Jude Waddy - NFL football player

References

External links

 
 Suitland High School Facts & Figures
 Suitland HS Technical Academy
 PGCPS Website

Public high schools in Maryland
Magnet schools in Maryland
Schools of the performing arts in the United States
Schools in Prince George's County, Maryland